Kirsti Biermann (born 2 August 1950) is a Norwegian speed skater, born in Oslo. She competed at the 1968 Winter Olympics in Grenoble, where she placed 8th in 500 m and 9th in 1000 m. She participated in four competitions at the 1972 Winter Olympics in Sapporo.

She is the sister of speed skater Tone Biermann.

References

External links 
 

1950 births
Living people
Sportspeople from Oslo
Norwegian female speed skaters
Olympic speed skaters of Norway
Speed skaters at the 1968 Winter Olympics
Speed skaters at the 1972 Winter Olympics